The New Taggart Hotel, located in Bend, Oregon, is listed on the National Register of Historic Places.

See also 
 National Register of Historic Places listings in Deschutes County, Oregon

References 

1911 establishments in Oregon
Buildings and structures completed in 1911
Commercial Style architecture in the United States
Hotels in Bend, Oregon
National Register of Historic Places in Bend, Oregon